Andrew Paul Feinberg (born August 5, 1952) is the director of the Center for Epigenetics, chief of the Division of Molecular Medicine in the Department of Medicine, and the King Fahd Professor of Medicine, Oncology, Molecular Biology & Genetics in the School of Medicine at Johns Hopkins University.

Andrew Feinberg received his B.A. in 1973 and M.D. in 1976 from the accelerated medical program at Johns Hopkins University, as well as an M.P.H. from Johns Hopkins in 1981. He did his residency in internal medicine, followed by a fellowship in genetics at Hopkins. He did a postdoctoral fellowship in developmental biology at UCSD where he researched the multiple differentiation paths of Dictyostelium discoideum. His research into hereditary inheritance of traits outside of DNA was initially seen as controversial, and he was told that if he continued this work, his funding would be cut off. 

Dr. Feinberg discovered epigenetic alterations in human cancer with Bert Vogelstein in 1983. He is also credited with the discovery of gene imprinting in humans. He has made many contributions to the field of epigenetics in cancer, and discovered the molecular basis of Beckwith-Wiedemann syndrome. He pursued this work while he was an HHMI Investigator at the University of Michigan from 1986-1994, when he returned to Johns Hopkins as King Fahd Professor of Molecular Medicine in the Department of Medicine.

Awards 
 Delta Omega, National Public Health Honorary Society, 1981
American Society for Clinical Investigation, 1990
 Association of American Physicians, 1995
 ISI, Most Cited Authors List (Top 0.1%), 2001
 MERIT Award, National Cancer Institute, 2001
Elected Member of the Institute of Medicine of the National Academy of Sciences, 2007
Elected Member of the National Academy of Medicine, 2007
 Wallenberg Fellow, Royal Swedish Academy of Sciences, 2009
Elected Fellow of the American Academy of Arts and Sciences, 2009
Inaugural Daniel Coit Gilman Scholar, Johns Hopkins University, 2011
 Feodor Lynen Medal, 2011
 NIH Director's Pioneer Award, 2011
Elected Fellow of the American Association for the Advancement of Science, 2011
Award for Excellence, Association for Molecular Pathology, 2017

Publications 
Feinberg has more than 92,000 citations in Google Scholar and an h-index of 112.

He was among the top 1% most cited in the world for subject field and year of publication in the 2019 and 2020 Thomson Reuters Highly Cited Researchers reports.

 Pubmed citations
 Google Scholar citations

Highly Cited Articles (more than 1500 citations)

 2004 with B Tycko, The history of cancer epigenetics, in: Nature Reviews Cancer. Vol. 4, nº 2; 143-153.
 1983 with B Vogelstein, Hypomethylation distinguishes genes of some human cancers from their normal counterparts, in: Nature. Vol. 301, nº 5895; 89-92.
 2010 with K Kim, A Doi, B Wen, K Ng, R Zhao, P Cahan, J Kim, MJ Aryee, H Ji, et al, Epigenetic memory in induced pluripotent stem cells, in: Nature. Vol. 467, nº 7313; 285-290.
 2009 with RA Irizarry, C Ladd-Acosta, B Wen, Z Wu, C Montano, P Onyango, H Cui, et al, The human colon cancer methylome shows similar hypo-and hypermethylation at conserved tissue-specific CpG island shores, in: Nature Genetics. Vol. 41, nº 2; 178-186.
 2006 with R Ohlsson, S Henikoff, The epigenetic progenitor origin of human cancer, in: Nature Reviews Genetics. Vol. 7, nº 1; 21-33.
 2014 with MJ Aryee, AE Jaffe, H Corrada-Bravo, C Ladd-Acosta, Minfi: a flexible and comprehensive Bioconductor package for the analysis of Infinium DNA methylation microarrays, in: Bioinformatics. Vol. 30, nº 10; 1363-1369.
 2007, Phenotypic plasticity and the epigenetics of human disease, in: Nature. Vol. 447, nº 7143; 433-440.

References 

1952 births
Living people
Fellows of the American Academy of Arts and Sciences
Johns Hopkins Bloomberg School of Public Health alumni
 Johns Hopkins Biomedical Engineering faculty
Johns Hopkins School of Medicine alumni
Howard Hughes Medical Investigators
Epigeneticists
Fellows of the American Association for the Advancement of Science
Members of the National Academy of Medicine
 University of Michigan faculty